Elmerimys is an extinct genus of rodent known from Miocene fossils found in Africa.

References

 Lavocat, R. 1973. Les rongeurs du Miocčne d’Afrique Orientale. Memoires et travaux Ecole Pratique des Hautes Etudes, Institut Montpellier, 1:1-284.

Myophiomyidae
Miocene rodents
Miocene mammals of Africa
Prehistoric rodent genera
Fossil taxa described in 1973